Kjeld Østrøm (born 8 January 1933) is a Danish rower. He competed at the 1956 Summer Olympics in Melbourne with the men's coxless pair where they were eliminated in the semi-final.

References

1933 births
Living people
Danish male rowers
Olympic rowers of Denmark
Rowers at the 1956 Summer Olympics
Rowers from Copenhagen
European Rowing Championships medalists